Goolden is a surname of Anglo-Saxon origin. Notable people with the surname include:

Francis Goolden (1885-1950), British Royal Navy officer
Jilly Goolden (born 1949), English wine critic, journalist, and television personality
Richard Goolden (1895-1981), British actor

See also
Goulden